Oleksiy Opanasovych Vadaturskyi (8 September 1947 – 31 July 2022) was a Ukrainian agricultural and grain logistics businessman and the founder of Nibulon, the largest grain logistics company in Ukraine. He was one of the wealthiest Ukrainians.

Involvement in the Russo-Ukraine War 
In 2014, following the Russian annexation of Crimea and support of separatists in the Donbass regions, Vadaturskyi financed a 2,000-strong militia with army vehicles. In 2018, he became one of 322 Ukrainians blacklisted by Russia. Following the 2022 Russian invasion, the blockade of grain exports, and the grain export agreement of 22 July, Vadaturskyi and his businesses were devising solutions to resume the normal flow of Ukrainian grain to foreign countries.

Death 
Vadaturskyi was killed with his wife in the early hours of 31 July by Russian missile strikes on the city of Mykolaiv. Seven or eight Russian missiles hit his house in the Zavodsky district, raising strong suspicions that Vadaturskyi was intentionally targeted and assassinated by Russia to affect the crop export industry of Ukraine. Ukraine stated that the missile which killed Vadaturskyi belonged to the S-300 series of missiles. Mykhailo Podolyak, an advisor to Ukrainian President Volodymyr Zelenskyy, called the missile strike a "premeditated murder [... of] one of the most important agricultural entrepreneurs in the country". The attack occurred as the first shipment of grain was getting ready to leave Ukraine on 1 August. The orthodox funeral service for Vadaturskyi on 12 August in a Kyiv cathedral was attended by several hundred people, including the mayor of Mykolaiv, Oleksandr Senkevych.

Vadaturskyi was succeeded by his son , a politician, married with three children.

Net Worth 
In 2021, Forbes rated Vadaturskyi's net worth at $430 million and named him as Ukraine's 24th wealthiest person.

Honours 
Vadaturskyi was awarded the Hero of Ukraine in 2007, the country's highest honour, for his role in the development of Ukrainian agricultural industry. Vadaturskyi was known as non-corruptible and pro-European.

See also 
 Nibulon Shipyard

References

External links
 Oleksiy Vadaturskyi
  Інтернет-проект «Герої України»

1947 births
2022 deaths
20th-century Ukrainian businesspeople
People from Odesa Oblast
Deaths by airstrike during the 2022 Russian invasion of Ukraine
Civilians killed in the Russian invasion of Ukraine
21st-century Ukrainian businesspeople
Recipients of the Order of State